Girolami is an Italian surname. Notable people with the surname include:

Ennio Girolami (1935–2013), Italian actor
Gregory S. Girolami, American professor of chemistry
Girolami method
Marino Girolami (1914–1994), Italian film director
Néstor Girolami (born 1989), Argentine racing driver
Paul Girolami  (1926–2023), British-Italian businessman
Remigio dei Girolami (1235–1319), Italian Dominican theologian

Italian-language surnames